The list of medieval universities comprises universities (more precisely, studia generalia) which existed in Europe during the Middle Ages. It also includes short-lived foundations and European educational institutions whose university status is a matter of debate. The degree-awarding university with its corporate organization and relative autonomy is a product of medieval Christian Europe. Before 1500, more than eighty universities were established in Western and Central Europe. During the subsequent Colonization of the Americas the university was introduced to the New World, marking the beginning of its worldwide spread as the center of higher learning everywhere (see List of oldest universities).

Definition 

There were many institutions of learning (studia) in the Middle Ages in Latin Europe—cathedral schools, "schools of rhetoric" (law faculties), etc. Historians generally restrict the term "medieval university" to refer to an institution of learning that was referred to as a studium generale in the Middle Ages.

There is no official strict definition of a studium generale, the term having emerged from customary usage. The following properties were common among them, and are often treated as defining criteria:
 It received students from everywhere (not merely the local district or region);
 It engaged in higher learning—i.e., that it went beyond teaching the Arts, and had at least one of the higher faculties (Theology, Law or Medicine).
 A significant part of the teaching was done by Masters (teachers with a higher degree)
 It enjoyed the privilege of jus ubique docendi—i.e., masters of that school were entitled to teach in any other school without a preliminary examination.
 Its teachers and students were allowed to enjoy any clerical benefices they might have elsewhere without meeting the mandatory residency requirements prescribed by Canon Law
 It enjoyed some degree of autonomy from local civil and diocesan authorities.

Charters issued by the Pope or Holy Roman Emperor were often needed to ensure privileges 4–6. The fourth condition (teaching elsewhere without examination) was originally considered by scholars of the time to be the most important criterion, with the result that the appellation studium generale was customarily reserved to refer only to the oldest and most prestigious schools—specifically Salerno, Bologna, Paris, and sometimes Oxford—until this oligopoly was broken by papal and imperial charters in the course of the 13th century. The fifth criterion (continued benefices) was the closest there was to an "official" definition of a studium generale used by the Church and academics from the 14th century onwards, although there were some notable exceptions (e.g., neither Oxford nor Padua received this right, but they were nonetheless universally considered "Studia Generalia by custom").

Modern historians have tended to focus on the first three requirements (students from everywhere, at least one higher faculty, teaching by masters). This has led to contention in making lists of Medieval universities. Some Italian universities, for instance, were quick to obtain papal charters and thus the privileges and title of a studium generale, but their student catchment never went much beyond the local district or they had only a couple of masters engaged in teaching. Other comparable schools (notably the more prestigious cathedral schools of France), may have had wider student catchment and more masters, but neglected or failed to secure the chartered privileges and thus were never referred to as studia generalia. It is common to include the former and exclude the latter from lists of "Medieval universities", but some historians have disputed this convention as arbitrary and unreflective of the state of higher learning in Europe.

Some historians have discarded the studium generale definition, and come up with their own criteria for a definition of a "university"—narrowing it by requiring, for instance, that a university have all three higher faculties (Theology, Law, Medicine) in order to be considered a "Medieval university" (very few had all three), whereas others widen it to include some of the more prestigious cathedral schools, palace schools and universities outside of Latin Europe (notably in the Greek and Islamic world, for example the Pandidakterion founded by the Byzantine emperor Theodosius II in 425 or University of al-Qarawiyyin in Morocco founded by Fatima al-Fihri in 859, which may be the "first university in the world and the oldest existing, and continually operating educational institution in the world").

There is also contention on the founding dates of many universities. Using the date of acquisition of a papal and royal/imperial charter is inadequate, as the older universities, believing their status and reputations sufficient and indisputable, refused or resisted asking for an official charter for a long time. Some historians trace the founding of a university to the first date when evidence of some kind of teaching was done in that locality, even if only local and limited. Others wait until there is evidence of higher learning, a wide student catchment, the emergence of its masters teaching elsewhere or a more definitive mention of it as a studium generale.

List 

The list is sorted by the date of recognition. At places where more than one university was established, the name of the institution is given in brackets.

See also 
 History of European research universities
 List of universities and colleges in Europe
 List of oldest universities in continuous operation

References

Sources 
 Roberts, John; Rodriguez Cruz, Agueda M.; Herbst, Jürgen: "Exporting Models", in: Ridder-Symoens, Hilde de (ed.): A History of the University in Europe. Vol. II: Universities in Early Modern Europe (1500–1800), Cambridge University Press, 1996, pp. 256–284
 Rüegg, Walter: "Foreword. The University as a European Institution", in: Ridder-Symoens, Hilde de (ed.): A History of the University in Europe. Vol. I: Universities in the Middle Ages, Cambridge University Press, 1992, pp. XIX–XX

Further reading 
 Jílek, Jubor (ed.): "Historical Compendium of European Universities/Répertoire Historique des Universités Européennes", Standing Conference of Rectors, Presidents and Vice-Chancellors of the European Universities (CRE), Geneva 1984
 Rüegg, Walter (ed.): A History of the University in Europe. Vol. III: Universities in the Nineteenth and Early Twentieth Centuries (1800–1945), Cambridge University Press, 2004, 
 Rüegg, Walter (ed.): A History of the University in Europe. Vol. IV: Universities Since 1945, Cambridge University Press, 2011, 

Medieval Universities
 
 
 
 
Medieval European education
History of academia